Djaloniella is a monotypic genus of flowering plants belonging to the family Gentianaceae. The only species is Djaloniella ypsilostyla.

Its native range is Western Tropical Africa.

References

Gentianaceae
Gentianaceae genera
Monotypic Gentianales genera